Książenice is a village in the administrative district of Gmina Czerwionka-Leszczyny, within Rybnik County, Silesian Voivodeship, in southern Poland.

The village has an area of 16.42 km2 and a population of 2,466.

References 

Villages in Rybnik County